Castle Rock is an album recorded by American jazz saxophonist Johnny Hodges featuring performances recorded in 1951 and 1952 and released on the Norgran label.

Reception

The Allmusic site awarded the album 3 stars out of 5 and noted "Hodges was evidently trying to make somewhat of a break from his established sound with this recording, though the results are mixed. It's still worth acquiring, though there are a number of better recordings available under Hodges' name".

Track listing
All compositions by Johnny Hodges, except as indicated.
 "Castle Rock" (Al Sears) - 2:40
 "The Jeep Is Jumpin'" (Duke Ellington, Johnny Hodges) - 2:45
 "A Gentle Breeze" (Sears) - 3:10
 "Globe Trotter" - 3:05
 "Jeep's Blues" (Ellington, Hodges) - 2:55
 "A Pound of Blues" (Leroy Lovett) - 3:05
 "You Blew Out the Flame in My Heart" - 3:20
 "Something to Pat Your Foot To" (Sears) - 2:50
 "Blue Fantasia" - 3:10
 "My Reward" (Ellington) - 3:10
 "Sideways" (Lovett) - 3:00
 "Wham" - 3:00 
Recorded in New York City on January 15, 1951 (tracks 7-10), January 15, 1951 (tracks 2 & 5), March 3, 1951 (tracks 1, 3 & 4) and January 13, 1952 (tracks 6, 11 & 12).

Personnel
Johnny Hodges - alto saxophone
Emmett Berry, (tracks 1-6, 11 & 12), Nelson Williams (tracks 7-10) - trumpet
Lawrence Brown - trombone
Al Sears - tenor saxophone
Leroy Lovett (tracks 1-3 & 5-12), Billy Strayhorn (track 4) - piano 
Al McKibbon (tracks 7-10), Lloyd Trotman (tracks 1-6, 11 & 12) - bass
Sonny Greer (tracks 1-5 & 7-10), Joe Marshall (tracks 6, 11 & 12) - drums

References

1955 albums
Johnny Hodges albums
Norgran Records albums
Albums produced by Norman Granz